Randy Wood (born March 25, 1947) is an American politician. He is a member of the Alabama House of Representatives from the 36th District, serving since 2002. He is a member of the Republican party.

References

Living people
Republican Party members of the Alabama House of Representatives
1947 births
21st-century American politicians